Arthur Lake (born Arthur Silverlake Jr., April 17, 1905 – January 9, 1987) was an American actor known best for bringing Dagwood Bumstead, the bumbling husband of Blondie, to life in film, radio, and television.

Early life and career
Lake was born in 1905 when his father Arthur Silverlake and uncle were touring with a circus in an aerial act known as "The Flying Silverlakes". His mother, Edith Goodwin, was an actress; his parents later appeared in vaudeville in a skit "Family Affair", traveling throughout the South and Southwest United States. Arthur first appeared on stage as a baby in Uncle Tom's Cabin; his sister Florence and he became part of the act in 1910. Their mother took the children to Hollywood to get into films, and Arthur made his screen debut in the silent Jack and the Beanstalk (1917). Florence became a successful actress achieving a degree of fame as one of the screen wives of comedian Edgar Kennedy.

Universal Pictures signed Lake to a contract where, as an adolescent, he played character parts in Westerns. He signed with RKO Pictures shortly after it formed in 1928. There he made Dance Hall (1929), and Cheer Up and Smile (1930). 

Moviegoers first heard Lake speak when he appeared as Harold Astor, the lead of the 1929 musical comedy On with the Show!, which is notable as the first all-talking feature film using the Vitaphone process, and as Warner Bros' first all-color film shot in two-color Technicolor. 

In the early sound film era, Lake typically played light romantic roles, often with a comic "Mama's Boy" tone to them, such as 1931's Indiscreet, starring Gloria Swanson.  He also had a substantial part as the bellhop in the 1937 film Topper.

As Dagwood in Blondie
Arthur Lake is best known for portraying Dagwood Bumstead, the husband of the title character of the Blondie comic strip, in 28 separate Blondie films produced by Columbia Pictures between 1938 and 1950. He was also the voice of Dagwood on the radio series which ran from 1938 to 1950, earning Lake a star on the Hollywood Walk of Fame at 6646 Hollywood Blvd. Many of the actors on the radio show noted Lake's commitment to the program, stating that on the day of the broadcast, Lake became Dagwood Bumstead.

Far from being upset about being typecast, Lake continued to embrace the role.  He played Dagwood in a short-lived 1957 Blondie TV series, and from 1960 on, he often gave speeches to Rotary clubs and other civic organizations, eagerly posing for pictures with a Dagwood sandwich.

Filmography

Personal life

Lake became very friendly with newspaper tycoon William Randolph Hearst and his mistress Marion Davies. He was a frequent guest at the beach house of Davies, where he met her niece,  Patricia Van Cleeve.  Lake and Van Cleeve married at San Simeon in 1937.

The now Patricia Lake's parentage  was the subject of much gossip and speculation.  However, at the time of her death, Patricia Lake reportedly admitted to being  the daughter of Davies and Hearst.

In his book about the Black Dahlia murder case, author Donald H. Wolfe asserts that Arthur Lake was questioned by the Los Angeles Police Department as a suspect, having been acquainted with the victim through her volunteer work at the Hollywood Canteen. No charges were filed and Lake was one of many persons of interest in a case that remains unsolved.

Lake died of a heart attack in Indian Wells, California, on January 9, 1987, and was interred in the Hollywood Forever Cemetery, in the Douras family mausoleum, along with actress Marion Davies and her husband, Horace G. Brown. Lake's widow Patricia was interred there upon her death in 1993.

References

External links

 
 

1905 births
1987 deaths
American male child actors
American male radio actors
American male silent film actors
American male television actors
American male film actors
Male actors from California
People from Greater Los Angeles
People from Indian Wells, California
Burials at Hollywood Forever Cemetery
People from Corbin, Kentucky
Male actors from Kentucky
20th-century American male actors
Columbia Pictures contract players
Radio personalities from Kentucky